The 1967 North Dakota State Bison football team was an American football team that represented North Dakota State University during the 1967 NCAA College Division football season as a member of the North Central Conference. In their second year under head coach Ron Erhardt, the team compiled a 9–1 record, finished as NCC champion, and lost in the Pecan Bowl to Texas–Arlington.

Schedule

References

North Dakota State
North Dakota State Bison football seasons
North Central Conference football champion seasons
North Dakota State Bison football